Aise Karo Naa Vidaa is an Indian television series that aired on Colors in 2010. This show was produced by DJ's a Creative Unit and starred Aastha Chaudhary and Anas Rashid.

Plot 
Reva is a young and innocent village woman who will soon marry. Unexpectedly, she gets raped by Prince Aryaman.

The princes' mother, Queen, gets Reva married to Prince Yashvardan, her elder son. The story then follows Reva, as she tries to adjust to the royal family and drown the sorrow of the past, as well as Prince Yashwardhan, who tries to gain the love and trust of his new wife.

Cast
 Aastha Chaudhary as Reva
 Anas Rashid as Yashvardhan
 Soni Singh as Jyotika
 Kishori Shahane as Rani Maa 
 Jaya Bhattacharya as Lakhi
 Lalit Parimoo as Badri
 Mohit Daga as Sharad Reva's brother
 Rohit Purohit as Aryaman 
 Sumukhi Pendse as Dai Maa
 Naveen Saini
 Sushmita Daan

References

External links
Official Website

2010 Indian television series debuts
Indian drama television series
Colors TV original programming
2010 Indian television series endings